Superparamagnetic iron platinum particles  (SIPPs) are nanoparticles that have been reported as magnetic resonance imaging contrast agents.  These are, however, investigational agents which have not yet been tried in humans.

References

Magnetic resonance imaging
Contrast agents